Reptar is a fictional character from the American animated television series Rugrats. It is a green T. rex (and sometimes appears in red-violet and lilac) with rounded, blue spike-like appendages on his back, which intentionally causes him to resemble and spoof Godzilla. Outside of Rugrats-related films, Reptar appears as a playable character in Nickelodeon Kart Racers, Nickelodeon Kart Racers 2: Grand Prix and 2021's Nickelodeon All-Star Brawl.

Character concept and depiction

Reptar is portrayed as being a fictional character in the Rugrats universe idolized by a majority of the children featured in the series, particularly Tommy Pickles and his friends. A gigantic green, irradiated Tyrannosaurus rex, Reptar's popularity as a character is noticeably akin to that possessed by Mickey Mouse, although his role is similar to Godzilla. When it appeared in Rugrats three-related films, it prominently showed a Japanese theme park that was depicting Reptar. This popularity is seen in the merchandise spawned from his character as seen in the program owned by the babies and in the numerous forms of entertainment which he has inspired, such as an amusement park, chocolate bar, funko pop, and an ice show (as featured in the episode "Reptar on Ice").

The Rugrats films
Reptar appeared in The Rugrats Movie film as a wagon built by Tommy's father Stu Pickles. The Reptar Wagon was no ordinary wagon. It was made like a high-tech car that can do various things such as talk and turn into a boat (Aqua Reptar) when in water, and has fire breath. The Rugrats took it along with them on a journey to the "hopsical" to return Tommy's newborn brother Dil, but they wind up getting lost in the forest. In this appearance, the Reptar wagon is voiced by Levi Curl and rapper Busta Rhymes of Flipmode Squad.

Reptar had a more important role as a giant robot in Rugrats in Paris, when Stu once again built a robotic likeness of the character. The robot's head fell off twice in the film, although Stu fixed it the first time for the play. The Rugrats also took it to the church to stop the wedding of Chuckie’s father Chas and villain Coco LaBouche who hates children.

The Reptar Wagon is seen in the background in Rugrats Go Wild near the beginning of the film in the Pickles' backyard. Unlike in the previous films, neither Reptar nor the wagon has any relevance to the plot.

The Reptar Wagon appeared in several episodes of Rugrats following the release of The Rugrats Movie once again voiced by Busta Rhymes through archive recordings from the film. The Reptar Wagon is rarely seen in the later episodes.

Other appearances
Outside of the Rugrats film, Reptar appeared as playable racer in 2018's Nickelodeon Kart Racers, Nickelodeon Kart Racers 2: Grand Prix and Nickelodeon Kart Racers 3: Slime Speedway in his green and purple variants. A dinosaur outfit that was referencing Boo from Monsters, Inc. and Reptar was added in Fortnite.

A normal-sized Reptar appears as a playable character in 2021's Nickelodeon All-Star Brawl, voiced by Fred Tatasciore as part of the June 2022 update of the game.

Reception
Overall, critics and fans have generally praised Reptar. Destructoid calls Reptar as his "Childhood favorites" in Nickelodeon Kart Racers. While Shacknews described Reptar as one of the most popular characters in the Rugrats universe, and further stated that "Still, a dinosaur is badass and he's a great choice to stomp all over the competition at Nickelodeon All-Star Brawl," Complex included Reptar's Wagon on their "Coolest Fictional Cars", and stated that "With extendable arms, a Busta Rhymes Reptar voice, and fire-spitting nostrils (on the original model), this is one badass baby ride." Zimbio ranked Reptar as 7th of the best pop-culture dinosaur, and stated that "At first glance, Reptar might seem like a spoof on Godzilla, but this uniquely weird dinosaur is truly an unforgettable character. From having his own cereal and chocolate bar to dancing on ice, Reptar is like Beyonce to Tommy, Chuckie, Phil, and Lil." Reptar was also included at Alternative Press on their "most metal cartoon characters", by stating that "This fire-breathing beast is loved and admired in playpens far and wide for his badass heroics throughout the Rugrats series and movies."

References

Rugrats and All Grown Up! characters
Television characters introduced in 1991
Animated characters introduced in 1991
Fictional dinosaurs
Fictional monsters
Fighting game characters,
Male characters in animated series
Kaiju